Elachista merimnaea is a moth of the family Elachistidae that is found in South Africa.

References

merimnaea
Endemic moths of South Africa
Moths described in 1920